Sulphur City is an unincorporated community in Mineral County, West Virginia, United States. Sulphur City is located along West Virginia Route 42.

The community was named for a sulphur spring near the original town site.

References 

Unincorporated communities in Mineral County, West Virginia
Unincorporated communities in West Virginia